Microcryptorhynchus is a genus of weevils in the family Curculionidae.

Species 

 Microcryptorhynchus abditiceps
 Microcryptorhynchus abnormis
 Microcryptorhynchus albistrigalis
 Microcryptorhynchus ambiguus
 Microcryptorhynchus andersoni
 Microcryptorhynchus angustatus
 Microcryptorhynchus angustior
 Microcryptorhynchus ater
 Microcryptorhynchus basipennis
 Microcryptorhynchus bicolor
 Microcryptorhynchus brevis
 Microcryptorhynchus caledonicus
 Microcryptorhynchus carinatus
 Microcryptorhynchus caudatus
 Microcryptorhynchus chaetectetoroides
 Microcryptorhynchus cheesmanae
 Microcryptorhynchus confinis
 Microcryptorhynchus convexus
 Microcryptorhynchus cookei
 Microcryptorhynchus crinitus
 Microcryptorhynchus curtus
 Microcryptorhynchus curvus
 Microcryptorhynchus cylindricollis
 Microcryptorhynchus discretus
 Microcryptorhynchus echinatus
 Microcryptorhynchus evanescens
 Microcryptorhynchus exilis
 Microcryptorhynchus fasciatus
 Microcryptorhynchus fasciculatus
 Microcryptorhynchus fitchiae
 Microcryptorhynchus fosbergi
 Microcryptorhynchus foveaventris
 Microcryptorhynchus fraudator
 Microcryptorhynchus freycinetiae
 Microcryptorhynchus fulgidus
 Microcryptorhynchus glaber
 Microcryptorhynchus gracilis
 Microcryptorhynchus guamae
 Microcryptorhynchus hirtus
 Microcryptorhynchus howensis
 Microcryptorhynchus humeralis
 Microcryptorhynchus impressicollis
 Microcryptorhynchus impressus
 Microcryptorhynchus interruptus
 Microcryptorhynchus irregularis
 Microcryptorhynchus irroratus
 Microcryptorhynchus kondoi
 Microcryptorhynchus linagri
 Microcryptorhynchus lucens
 Microcryptorhynchus mangaoae
 Microcryptorhynchus mangareva
 Microcryptorhynchus mayae
 Microcryptorhynchus minutus
 Microcryptorhynchus modicus
 Microcryptorhynchus montevagus
 Microcryptorhynchus morongotae
 Microcryptorhynchus niger
 Microcryptorhynchus nitidus
 Microcryptorhynchus norfolcensis
 Microcryptorhynchus obesus
 Microcryptorhynchus oreas
 Microcryptorhynchus orientissimus
 Microcryptorhynchus orofenae
 Microcryptorhynchus paenulatus
 Microcryptorhynchus pallidus
 Microcryptorhynchus parvus
 Microcryptorhynchus perpusillus
 Microcryptorhynchus pervisus
 Microcryptorhynchus planatus
 Microcryptorhynchus praesetosus
 Microcryptorhynchus premnae
 Microcryptorhynchus proximus
 Microcryptorhynchus punctipennis
 Microcryptorhynchus pusillus
 Microcryptorhynchus pygmaeus
 Microcryptorhynchus quietus
 Microcryptorhynchus reticulatus
 Microcryptorhynchus rotundipennis
 Microcryptorhynchus rubellus
 Microcryptorhynchus rufimanus
 Microcryptorhynchus rufirostris
 Microcryptorhynchus ruivavaensis
 Microcryptorhynchus rurutuensis
 Microcryptorhynchus sanctijohni
 Microcryptorhynchus setifer

 Microcryptorhynchus setosus
 Microcryptorhynchus setulosus
 Microcryptorhynchus silvestris
 Microcryptorhynchus similis
 Microcryptorhynchus spathifer
 Microcryptorhynchus spinifer
 Microcryptorhynchus squamicollis
 Microcryptorhynchus squamosus
 Microcryptorhynchus sternalis
 Microcryptorhynchus superstes
 Microcryptorhynchus tahae
 Microcryptorhynchus tenuis
 Microcryptorhynchus testaceus
 Microcryptorhynchus thoracicus
 Microcryptorhynchus trukae
 Microcryptorhynchus tubuaiensis
 Microcryptorhynchus tumidus
 Microcryptorhynchus vagus
 Microcryptorhynchus varians
 Microcryptorhynchus ventralis
 Microcryptorhynchus vitiensis
 Microcryptorhynchus wilkesii

References

Curculionidae genera